The Festival de las Máscaras (2011) (Spanish for "Festival of the Mask") was an annual professional wrestling major event produced by Mexican professional wrestling promotion International Wrestling Revolution Group (IWRG), which took place on August 2, 2011 in Arena Naucalpan, Naucalpan, State of Mexico, Mexico. For this annual event the "Comisión de Box y Lucha Libre Mexico D.F." (Mexico City Boxing and Wrestling Commission) allowed wrestlers who had previously been unmasked after losing a Luchas de Apuestas, or bet match, to wear their masks again. The main event of the show heralded back to long running storyline feuds between Rayo de Jalisco, Jr., El Canek and Konnan against the brothers known as Los Hermanos Dinamita (Cien Caras, Máscara Año 2000 and Universo 2000). Cien Caras had originally lost his mask to Rayo de Jalisco, Jr. and Universo 2000 was unmasked by El Canek, but for one night they were allowed to wear the masks again as they wrestled against their longtime rivals.

Production

Background
The wrestling mask has always held a sacred place in lucha libre, carrying with it a mystique and anonymity beyond what it means to wrestlers elsewhere in the world. The ultimate humiliation a luchador can suffer is to lose a Lucha de Apuestas, or bet match. Following a loss in a Lucha de Apuesta match the masked wrestler would be forced to unmask, state their real name and then would be unable to wear that mask while wrestling anywhere in Mexico. Since 2007 the Mexican wrestling promotion International Wrestling Revolution Group (IWRG; Sometimes referred to as Grupo Internacional Revolución in Spanish) has held a special annual show where they received a waiver to the rule from the State of Mexico Wrestling Commission and wrestlers would be allowed to wear the mask they previously lost in a Lucha de Apuestas. The annual Festival de las Máscaras ("Festival of the Masks") event is also partly a celebration or homage of lucha libre history with IWRG honoring wrestlers of the past. The IWRG's Festival de las Máscaras shows, as well as the majority of the IWRG shows in general, are held in "Arena Naucalpan", owned by the promoters of IWRG and their main arena. The 2011 Festival de las Máscaras show was the fifth year in a row IWRG held the show.

Storylines
The event featured five professional wrestling matches with different wrestlers involved in pre-existing scripted feuds, plots and storylines. Wrestlers were portrayed as either heels (referred to as rudos in Mexico, those that portray the "bad guys") or faces (técnicos in Mexico, the "good guy" characters) as they followed a series of tension-building events, which culminated in a wrestling match or series of matches.

Previously unmasked wrestlers

Outside of the main event there were not specific, pre-existing storylines built into any of the matches on the show, primarily because the show paid homage to wrestling history more than being part of any current storylines. Only the main event came with any sort of back history as El Canek, Rayo de Jalisco, Jr. and Konnan were teamed up to face Los Hermanos Dinamita (Cien Caras, Máscara Año 2000 and Universo 2000). Canek, Rayo and Konnan had all had previous feuds with one or all members of Los Hermanos Dinamita, from as far back as the 1980s. Rayo de Jalisco, Jr. was responsible for unmasking Cien Caras in 1990 when he won a Lucha de Apuesta over Caras. El Canek had been the man to unmask Universo 2000 in 2004, in a match that actually also included Rayo de Jalisco, Jr. Both Konnan and Máscara Año 2000 had lost their mask to the same man, Perro Aguayo, but had a long running storyline with each other in the early days of Asistencia Asesoría y Administración (AAA).

Results

References

External links 
IWRG official website

2011 in professional wrestling
2011 in Mexico
2011
July 2011 events in Mexico